The Life of Vergie Winters is a 1934 American  Pre-Code film, starring Ann Harding and John Boles.

Plot
From her Parkville jail cell, Vergie Winters watches the funeral procession of Senator John Shadwell and remembers her twenty-year past with him: The moment young lawyer John returns to Parkville from an extended honeymoon with his social climbing wife Laura, he visits Vergie, his former lover. After a passionate embrace, John explains to the youthful milliner that he had abandoned their romance because Vergie's father had told him that she was pregnant by laborer Hugo McQueen and would be forced to marry. Vergie then tells John that, to keep her from marrying John, Laura's father had paid her father $10,000 to tell him that devastating lie.
 
Still deeply in love, John and Vergie continue to see each other, but when John starts to campaign for Congress, Preston, a political boss, informs Vergie that, if John is to receive his vital support, she must forego their affair. Although Vergie agrees to Preston's terms, John refuses to end the relationship and spends a long evening with her before the election.

After a victorious win, John moves to Washington, D.C. with Laura, Vergie bears his child under an assumed name. John then adopts the baby, named Joan, whom he claims is the child of a destitute family friend.

At the start of World War I, John returns to Parkville and once again resumes his affair with Vergie. When one of John's late night rendezvous is witnessed by a town gossip and reported to Mike Davey, John's only political enemy, Vergie's successful millinery shop is boycotted, and she is shunned by all but the local prostitutes. In addition, Davey hires Preston's son Barry to steal from Preston's home safe a page from a hotel register on which Vergie had written her assumed name. As Barry is breaking into his father's safe, however, Preston mistakes him for a burglar and kills him, but tells his butler that a burglar shot his son.

Many years later, after John has started a prosperous airline company and has been elected senator, Vergie spends her mornings watching a now grown Joan horseback riding with her fiancé, Ranny Truesdale. Unknown to Vergie, Laura has hired a private detective to spy on her in order to prove that Joan is actually her rival's daughter. Unable to secure her proof, Laura forces John to tell Joan that she is adopted. To John's relief, Joan and Ranny accept the news calmly and proceed with their marriage plans.

After the wedding, John informs Laura that he wants a divorce so that he can marry Vergie. Laura, desperate to hang on to her social standing, follows John to Vergie's house and, in a rage, shoots and kills him. Because Vergie is unwilling to name Laura as the murderer, she is convicted of the crime and sent to prison. One year later, Joan and Ranny, having heard Laura's dying confession about the killing, secure a pardon for Vergie and offer her a permanent place in their home.

Cast
 Ann Harding as Vergie Winters
 John Boles as John Shadwell
 Helen Vinson as Laura Shadwell
 Betty Furness as Joan Shadwell
 Frank Albertson as Ranny Truesdale
 Lon Chaney Jr. as Hugo McQueen
 Sara Haden as Winnie Belle
 Molly O'Day as Sadie
 Ben Alexander as Barry Preston
 Donald Crisp as Mike Davey
 Maidel Turner as Ella Heenan
 Cecil Cunningham as Pearl Turner

Reception
It made a profit of $87,000. The film was a box office disappointment for RKO.

Upon release, the film was condemned by the Roman Catholic Archdiocese of Chicago as "immoral and indecent".

References

External links
 

RKO Pictures films
1934 films
1934 drama films
American drama films
American black-and-white films
1930s English-language films
Films directed by Alfred Santell
1930s American films